Fatma Mohamed Ahmed Rashed (born July 19, 1984) is an Egyptian Olympic rower. She represented Egypt in 2012 Summer Olympics in London.

Olympic Participation

London 2012 
Rowing  – Women's lightweight double sculls

References 

1984 births
Egyptian female rowers
Olympic rowers of Egypt
Rowers at the 2012 Summer Olympics
Living people